George Christian Jepsen (born November 23, 1954) is an American lawyer and politician who served as the 24th Attorney General of Connecticut from 2011 to 2019.

Jepsen was a State Senator from Connecticut's 27th Senate District, representing Stamford and part of Darien, and served in the Connecticut Senate from 1991 to 2003. During his time in the Senate, he served as Senate Majority Leader from 1997 to 2003. Prior to that, he served in the Connecticut House of Representatives from 1987 to 1991, representing part of Stamford in Connecticut's 148th House District. After leaving the State Senate, he became Chairman of the Connecticut State Democratic Party from 2003 to 2005.

Biography
A Phi Beta Kappa graduate of Dartmouth College, Jepsen earned his J.D. degree from Harvard Law School with honors and also earned a master's degree in public policy from the Kennedy School of Government. To help pay for his education, he worked as a teaching fellow in constitutional law for former Watergate prosecutor Archibald Cox.

Professional career
Following graduation, Jepsen worked as staff counsel for the carpenter's union (UBC Local 210) for Western Connecticut. For nearly ten years, Jepsen negotiated contracts for wages and benefits, represented injured workers, ensured job safety, and advocated for different bidding practices.

In private practice, Jepsen worked at some of Connecticut's top law firms. His legal experience included work with the probate court, estate planning, representing small business in contract negotiations, government compliance, and real estate transactions. He also defended individuals in the criminal courts and served as counsel to clients in the civil courts. Jepsen successfully worked on complex legal issues as part of a successful appellate team in a number of cases before the Connecticut Supreme Court.

Political career

Connecticut General Assembly (1987–2003)
Jepsen served 16 years in the Connecticut General Assembly, first as State Representative from the 148th House District, and then as a State Senator from Connecticut's 27th Senate District, the last six as Majority Leader. As a legislator, Jepsen worked in a variety of areas including; clean energy, gun safety, & civil rights. Jepsen assisted in the development of laws that reformed HMO and insurance practices. As Senate Majority Leader, Jepsen worked to develop bills that protect Connecticut's natural assets.

Jepsen co-authored the Open Space Trust Fund, an initiative that sets aside $10 million in funding for the purchase of open space.

Jepsen worked to pass legislation to revitalize blighted areas in brownfields, including efforts to expand state financial assistance to re-developers. This was incentivized by tax credits to businesses that invested in redevelopment of contaminated properties in the state.

Jepsen helped the passage of legislation to replace Connecticut's “Sooty Six” power plants with cleaner plants that have lower emissions. These six old coal-burning plants were contributing to Connecticut's unique air pollution problem and rise in asthma rates. This initiative also involved new funding to upgrade sewage treatment plants for cleaner rivers.

As Senate Majority Leader, Jepsen became a national leader against the National Rifle Association. He helped pass landmark legislation prohibiting the sale or possession of assault weapons, mandating trigger locks, and necessitating tougher background checks. This work was nationally recognized by the Brady Campaign and the Million Mom March.

As Senate Majority Leader, Jepsen worked to ban sexual orientation discrimination, to strengthen hate crime laws, and to expand Connecticut's living will laws.

Jepsen supported health insurance reform to improve covered services for mental illness and emergency room conditions. He helped mandate that health insurers cover the costs of mammograms and birth control, and helped pass legislation to outlaw “drive-through” mastectomies and childbirth deliveries, so insurers cover at least a 48-hour hospital stay.

Connecticut Attorney General election, 2010

Jepsen announced on January 6, 2010, that he would form an exploratory committee for Attorney General, receiving the Democratic Party's endorsement on May 22.

On July 12 Jepsen announced he had qualified for public financing in the Citizens Election Program.

On November 2, 2010, he was elected as Attorney General of Connecticut

Connecticut Attorney General election, 2014
Jepsen was reelected in 2014, defeating Republican opponent Kie Westby.

Electoral history 

*Jepsen was also listed on the A Connecticut Party line.

*Jepsen was also listed on the Working Families Party line; Fournier was also listed on the Independent Party line.

*Jepsen was also listed on the Working Families Party line; Westby was also listed on the Independent Party line.

References

External links
Official website of Attorney General George Jepsen

|-

|-

|-

|-

1954 births
21st-century American politicians
Connecticut Attorneys General
Democratic Party Connecticut state senators
Dartmouth College alumni
Harvard Law School alumni
Living people
Democratic Party members of the Connecticut House of Representatives
Politicians from Stamford, Connecticut
Harvard Kennedy School alumni
State political party chairs of Connecticut